Babacar Mbaye Diop (born 21 October 1993) is a Senegalese footballer who plays as a forward. He made his Süper Lig debut on 24 February 2012.

References

External links
 Babacar Diop at TFF.org

1993 births
Living people
Footballers from Dakar
Senegalese footballers
Kayserispor footballers
Gebzespor footballers
Turun Palloseura footballers
Doğan Türk Birliği footballers
AC Kajaani players
Süper Lig players
Veikkausliiga players
Ykkönen players
Association football forwards
Senegalese expatriate footballers
Senegalese expatriate sportspeople in Turkey
Senegalese expatriate sportspeople in Finland
Expatriate footballers in Turkey
Expatriate footballers in Northern Cyprus
Expatriate footballers in Finland